Litton Reservoirs (also known as Coley Reservoirs) are two reservoirs near the village of Litton, Somerset, England. They are operated by Bristol Water.

They lie on the boundary between Bath and North East Somerset and Mendip districts.

The individual lakes are called Lower Litton and Upper Litton. They were built around 1850 by the Bristol Waterworks Company in conjunction with the "Line of Works" to bring water from the Mendip Hills to Bristol.

A public footpath goes around the lakes and across the dam. The banks are home to a variety of flowers including; Primroses (Primula vulgaris), Common Bluebell (Hyacinthoides non-scripta, sometimes Endymion non-scriptus or Scilla non-scripta), Wood anemone (Anemone nemorosa), Violets and Campion.

Several species of birds are frequent visitors including; Moorhen (Gallinula), Coot (Fulica), Mallard (Anas platyrhynchos), Swan and Tufted duck (Aythya fuligula).

Fishing (under permit) is generally for rainbow (Oncorhynchus mykiss) and brown trout (Salmo trutta). Fish breeding takes place in the netted area immediately below the upper dam is the site for fish breeding.

Photographs

References

External links
 River Chew web site

Drinking water reservoirs in England
Mendip Hills
Reservoirs in Somerset